Braude is a lunar impact crater located on the far side of the Moon. The crater is named after radio astronomer Semion Braude. The crater was adopted by the IAU in 2009. The nearest major feature is the Schrödinger crater. Also located nearby is the Wiechert crater, which is located less than 170 kilometers from the southern pole.

Braude was proposed in 2018 as the landing site for a potential Ukrainian mission to the moon, specifically as the site of a landing probe.

References

External links 

 LAC-144 area – Map of southern lunar pole

LQ30 quadrangle
Impact craters on the Moon